Hun Sen Cup is the main football knockout tournament in Cambodia. The 2008 Hun Sen Cup was the 2nd season of the Hun Sen Cup, the premier knockout tournament for association football clubs in Cambodia involving Cambodian League and provincial teams organized by the Football Federation of Cambodia.

Khemara Keila FC were the defending champions, having beaten Nagacorp 4–2 on penalty shoot-out after extra time 1-1 in the previous season's final.

Group stage
Teams qualified to the Round of 16:

Group A: Kirivong Sok Sen Chey, Build Bright University, Sihanoukville FC
Group B: Nagacorp FC, Phuchung Neak FC,
Group C: Khemara Keila FC, Moha Garuda FC, Pursat FC
Group D: Phnom Penh Empire, Preah Khan Reach
Group E: Spark FC, Baksey Chamkrong FC (Siem Reap), Phnom Pros FC
Group F: Lion FC, National Defense Ministry FC, Kampong Speu FC

Round of 16

Quarter-finals

Semi-finals

Third place play-off

Final

Awards
 Top Goal Scorers: Sok Chanraksmey of Spark FC (12 goals)
 Goalkeeper of the Season: Ouk Mic of Preah Khan Reach
 Fair Play:Preah Khan Reach

See also
 2008 Cambodian League
 Cambodian League
 Hun Sen Cup

References

Hun Sen Cup seasons
2008 in Cambodian football